

Wolfgang's Steakhouse is a steakhouse whose flagship restaurant is located on Park Avenue in Manhattan where patrons are encouraged to tip in $2 bills. The restaurant is owned by former headwaiter at Peter Luger Steak House, Wolfgang Zwiener. Wolfgang's has been frequently ranked as among the top ten steakhouses in New York City. Notable patrons include Jimmy Fallon, Brain Malfettone, Mike McDonald, Tom Schlobohm and attorney Alexander M. Dudelson.   The staff has been described as "more efficient than warm" and the atmosphere as "gruff", by Frank Bruni of the New York Times.

History
Wolfgang's Steakhouse was founded in 2004 by Wolfgang Zwiener, the headwaiter at Peter Luger Steak House, with over 40 years of experience. Its first location is on 4 Park Avenue in Manhattan, within the former Della Robbia Bar, a designated New York City interior landmark.

The restaurant has since expanded with 11 locations, including New Jersey, California, Florida and some Asian countries, including Japan and South Korea. A branch opened on Duddell Street in Hong Kong in June 2017.

See also
 List of restaurants in New York City
 List of steakhouses

References

External links
 

2004 establishments in New York City
German restaurants in the United States
German-American culture in New York City
Park Avenue
Restaurants established in 2004
Steakhouses in New York City